Patrick Edward Fallon (born December 19, 1967) is an American businessman and politician. A member of the Republican Party, he has been the U.S. representative for  since 2021. He served the 30th district of the Texas Senate from 2019 to 2021. Fallon was also a member of the Texas House of Representatives for the 106th district from 2013 to 2019.

Early life and education
Fallon was born in Pittsfield, Massachusetts. Both his parents were public school teachers, and he was raised in rural areas.

Fallon earned his bachelor's degree in government and international relations from the University of Notre Dame, where he played varsity football under coach Lou Holtz and was part of the 1988 national championship team. He ran a t-shirt business as a student and participated in campus political activities. He was a cadet in the Reserve Officers Training Corps of the United States Air Force before serving for four years, during which he received the Air Force Achievement Medal.

Career
After college, Fallon relocated to Denton County, Texas, in the early 1990s. He is the president and chief executive officer of Virtus Apparel, a company that specializes in clothing of military and patriotic design. Based in Prosper, Texas, it has a dozen national locations and about 100 total employees.

Politics
In 2009, Fallon launched a grassroots campaign that netted him 57% of the vote to defeat three opponents for an at-large seat on the Frisco City Council. In the Denton County portion of Frisco, which consists of about one-third of the voters in House District 106, Fallon polled 65% of the vote. In his first year on the city council, Fallon voted against a tax rate increase. In 2010, he voted against a city budget that would have increased the municipal debt. In May 2011, his council colleagues selected him to serve as mayor pro tem.

According to D Magazine, in 2012, Fallon falsified his residency, not living in the district he represented. That same year, Fallon won the Republican nomination in the reconfigured District 106, in which incumbent Republican Rodney Anderson of Grand Prairie did not run. Instead, Anderson unseated incumbent Republican Linda Harper-Brown in the 2014 primary election in neighboring District 105. Fallon won the general election on November 6, 2012, with 41,785 votes (83.2%) to Libertarian Party nominee Rodney Caston's 8,455 (16.8%). Fallon faced no Democratic Party opponent in the election.

Fallon co-authored a 2013 Texas law that allows students and employees of independent school districts to say "Merry Christmas" rather than the secular "Happy Holidays".

Fallon ran unopposed for the Republican nomination in 2014 and defeated Democrat Lisa Osterholt and Libertarian Rodney Caston in the general election with 24,419 votes, almost 70% of the total. In the 2016 Republican primary, Fallon defeated challenger Trent Trubenbach with 16,106 votes (82.9%) to Tubenbach's 3,327 (17.1%). He won the general election with 80.8% of the vote.

In July 2017, Fallon announced that he would challenge incumbent state Senator Craig Estes for the Republican nomination in Senate District 30. Fallon defeated Estes and Nocona businessman Craig Carter in the primary on March 6, 2018, with 53,881 votes (62%). In the November 6 general election, Fallon defeated Democratic nominee Kevin Lopez with 233,949 votes (73.9%) to Lopez's 82,449 (26.1%). Fallon served on the House committees on Human Services and Technology.

Legislative positions
Fallon defended his "Merry Christmas" law in an appearance on David Barton's WallBuilders Live radio program, telling co-host Rick Green, a former member of the Texas House from Hays County in suburban Austin, that those offended by public schools hosting Christmas parties should examine their own hearts to evaluate their attitudes. Both Fallon and Green said that no citizen has a constitutional right "not to be offended". Fallon vowed to make T-shirts with a Christmas theme for pupils to wear on the day before the holiday break.

In 2013 Fallon supported Texas House Bill 2, a bill that would ban abortion after 20 weeks of gestation and require abortion providers to have admitting privileges at a nearby hospital. The measure passed the House, 96–49. These issues brought forth an unsuccessful filibuster in the Texas State Senate by Senator Wendy R. Davis. Parts of the bill were later deemed unconstitutional and struck down by the Supreme Court of the United States in Whole Woman's Health v. Hellerstedt. The Texas Right to Life Committee rated Fallon 100% favorable.

Fallon opposed the bill to establish a taxpayer-funded breakfast program for public schools; the measure passed the House, 73–58. He co-sponsored legislation to provide marshals for school security as a separate law-enforcement entity. He co-sponsored the successful bill to extend the franchise tax exemption to certain small businesses. He voted to require testing for narcotics of those individuals receiving unemployment compensation.

Fallon co-sponsored the measure to forbid the state from engaging in the enforcement of federal regulations of firearms. He co-sponsored legislation to allow college and university officials to carry concealed weapons on campus and in vehicles in the name of security. He voted to reduce the time required to obtain a concealed-carry permit. Fallon voted for term limits for certain state officials. To protect election integrity, Fallon supported legislation to forbid an individual from turning in multiple ballots.

Comments on the LGBTQ community
In 2018, Fallon was criticized for his remarks about State Representative Mary González, an openly pansexual woman, while delivering a speech to the local Wichita County Republican Women's group. The El Paso Times quoted Fallon:

Fallon later apologized, saying, "It was an innocent little comment about mocking the labeling, not a person."

Interest group ratings
In 2015 Fallon was named one of "The 3 Worst North Texas Legislators" by D Magazine, which wrote, "Fallon has a lawyerlike relationship with the truth" and was "vindictive, and he’ll say anything to get what he wants".

By contrast, Phyllis Schlafly's Eagle Forum, managed in Texas by Cathie Adams, a former state chairman of the Texas Republican Party and a Fallon supporter, rated Fallon 95%. The Young Conservatives of Texas scored him 92%. The Texas League of Conservation Voters rated him 25%; Environment Texas, 28%. Texans for Fiscal Responsibility rated Fallon 98%; the Texas Association of Business, 80%. The National Rifle Association rated him 92%.

U.S. House of Representatives

Elections

2020

In May 2020, Fallon launched a campaign for Texas's 4th congressional district to replace former U.S. Representative John Ratcliffe, who resigned to become Director of National Intelligence. On August 8, 2020, Fallon was selected to replace Ratcliffe on the November ballot by the 18 county Republican Party chairs and precinct chairs in the district, winning the nomination with 82 votes to his nearest opponent's 34. Fallon faced Democrat Russell Foster in the November general election. According to The Texas Tribune, the district was so heavily Republican that the county Republican chairs effectively chose Ratcliffe's successor when they chose Fallon to replace him as the Republican nominee.

As expected, Fallon won the general election in a landslide, with 75% of the vote to Foster's 22%. When he took office, he was only the sixth person to represent this district since its creation in 1903.

Tenure
On January 6, 2021, Fallon, along with 147 of his fellow congressional Republicans, voted to block certification of the results for President-elect Joe Biden's 2020 United States presidential election.

Fallon voted to include provisions for drafting women in the National Defense Authorization Act of 2022.

Committee assignments
Committee on Armed Services
 Subcommittee on Military Personnel
 Subcommittee on Cyber, Innovative Technologies and Information Systems
United States House Committee on Oversight and Reform
Subcommittee on Environment

Caucus memberships
Republican Study Committee
Congressional Western Caucus
 Values Action Team
 Working Forests Caucus 
Congressional Taiwan Caucus
Second Amendment Caucus
 Special Operations Forces (SOF) Caucus 
 Depot Caucus
 F-35 Caucus
Conservative Climate Caucus

Investigation
In February 2022, the Office of Congressional Ethics (OCE) board filed a report stating that there was "substantial reason to believe" that Fallon had violated a federal stock law. The House Committee on Ethics released that report on May 31, 2022, indicating that it was investigating Fallon over repeated reporting violations of the STOCK Act, enacted in 2012 to prevent insider trading using non-public information by members of Congress and other government employees. Members of Congress are required to report any stock transaction over $1,000 within 45 days. Violations are subject to a $200 fine.

The OCE report stated that during the first half of 2021, Fallon filed late reports representing as much as $17.53 million in trades. An OCE review of his record began in the fall of 2021. Reports for trades made in December 2021 again missed the required filing date. The OCE report states, "Rep. Fallon produced a limited set of documents to the OCE and declined to interview with the OCE. This non-cooperation undermined the OCE's ability to verify Rep. Fallon's overall STOCK Act compliance and to fully assess the reasons for his late filings."
  
Fallon initially claimed he thought that reporting was required annually, as in the Texas legislature. On March 18, 2022, one of his lawyers, Kate Belinski, sent the OCE a letter insisting that Fallon's beliefs were "a common misconception, which, coupled with the overwhelming amount of information new members and their staff receive at the beginning of their terms, often results in inadvertent" late disclosures. She insisted that Fallon had cooperated by providing the documents OCE requested. But the OCE report noted Fallon's "late disclosure of reportable transactions, which continued even after he was on notice of his STOCK Act filing obligations".

Personal life
Fallon is married to Susan Kimberly Garner; they have two sons.

During his tenure in the state senate, Fallon lived in the Denton County portion of Prosper, which was just outside the 4th's boundaries. While candidates for the House are only constitutionally required to live in the state they wish to represent, longstanding convention holds that they live either in or reasonably close to the district they wish to represent. His state senate district included much of the eastern portion of the congressional district. Since his election to Congress, Fallon has claimed a home in Sherman, which is in the 4th, as his official residence.

Fallon is a member of Holy Cross Catholic Church in The Colony. He is a donor to Dallas Baptist University, Frisco Family Services, and the Boys & Girls Clubs of America.

References

External links

Representative Pat Fallon official U.S. House website
Pat Fallon for Congress

|-

|-

|-

1967 births
Living people
21st-century American politicians
Businesspeople from Texas
Catholics from Massachusetts
Catholics from Texas
Catholic politicians from Texas
Republican Party members of the Texas House of Representatives
Notre Dame Fighting Irish football players
People from Edgartown, Massachusetts
People from Frisco, Texas
People from Pittsfield, Massachusetts
Politicians from Pittsfield, Massachusetts
Republican Party members of the United States House of Representatives from Texas
Texas city council members
United States Air Force officers
Notre Dame College of Arts and Letters alumni
Military personnel from Texas
Military personnel from Massachusetts